Feargal Logan is a Gaelic football manager and former player, who was a starting member of the Tyrone county team that reached the 1995 All-Ireland Senior Football Championship Final.

Legal career
Since retiring from play, Logan's name has become more known in GAA circles for his work as a lawyer, representing players in disciplinary hearings, most famously reducing Ryan McMenamin's suspension in 2005 to allow him to play the crunch quarter final game against Dublin, by pointing out that the Central Disciplinary Committee had no authority to use television footage when considering a player's punishment. This appeal set a precedent that allowed several other players to successfully revoke their suspensions, such as Armagh players, Kieran McKeever and Paul McGrane.

The Gaelic Players Association used Logan's legal abilities during its early years, as he drafted its articles of association.

Managerial career
Logan was Tyrone under-21 manager and led the team to an All-Ireland title in 2015.

He was appointed senior co-manager (with Brian Dooher) of the Tyrone footballers in November 2020, succeeding Mickey Harte.

Personal life
Logan has three children: two sons and a daughter, Conor Logan, Michael Logan and Marie Claire.

References

Year of birth missing (living people)
Living people
Gaelic football managers
Tyrone inter-county Gaelic footballers